Serín is a district (parroquia rural) of the municipality of Gijón / Xixón, in Asturias, Spain.

The population of Serín was 312 in 2012.

Serín is located on the western area of Gijón / Xixón, and borders the Asturian municipalities of Llanera, Corvera and Carreño.

Villages and its neighbourhoods

References

External links
 Official Toponyms - Principality of Asturias website.
 Official Toponyms: Laws - BOPA Nº 229 - Martes, 3 de octubre de 2006 & DECRETO 105/2006, de 20 de septiembre, por el que se determinan los topónimos oficiales del concejo de Gijón.

Parishes in Gijón